The following tables show the professional boxers listed in the latest top-10 pound for pound world rankings published by each of:
 The Ring magazine
 Boxing Writers Association of America (BWAA — men only)
 Transnational Boxing Rankings Board (TBRB — men only)
 ESPN
 BoxRec

Men's

Women's

See also

 List of current world boxing champions
 List of The Ring magazine world champions
 List of The Ring pound for pound rankings
 List of fights between two The Ring pound for pound boxers
 List of boxing weight classes

References

Boxing awards
Boxing-related lists
Pound for pound